Punatherium is an extinct genus of xenarthran, belonging to the family Dasypodidae. It lived from the Middle to the Late Eocene, and its fossilized remains were discovered in South America.

Description

This animal, probably quite similar to modern armadillos, is only known from a few osteoderms. It was probably a medium sized armadillo, comparable to the big hairy armadillo in size. It is characterized by a pelvic region equipped with a rigid shield of osteoderms fused together, themselves endowed of a main figure anteriorly circumscribed by three large foramina. Other large foramina were present, located in the lateral and posterior margins. They formed four peripheral figures, all anteriorly disposed. The contact margins between the osteoderms had several low and blunt protuberances. The semi-mobile osteoderms, probably situated in the back and flanks, show a lageniform main figure, surrounded by six large perforations, except in the posterior area.

Classification

Punatherium catamarcensis was first described in 2016, based on fossil remains found in Middle-Late Eocene terrains from the Catamarca Province of Argentina. Punatherium was a member of the family Dasypodidae, which includes the modern nine-banded armadillo.

Bibliography
Ciancio, M.R., Herrera, C., Aramayo, A., Payrola, P., and Babot, J. 2016. Diversity of cingulate xenarthrans in the middle–late Eocene of Northwestern Argentina. Acta Palaeontologica Polonica 61 (3): 575–590.

Prehistoric cingulates
Prehistoric placental genera
Eocene xenarthrans
Eocene genus first appearances
Eocene mammals of South America
Eocene genus extinctions
Paleogene Argentina
Fossils of Argentina
Fossil taxa described in 2016